Zelma Cēsniece-Freidenfelde (17 February 1892 – 22 December 1929) was a Latvian physician and politician. In 1920 she was one of the six women elected to the Constitutional Assembly, Latvia's first female parliamentarians.

Biography
Cēsniece-Freidenfelde was born in Zaļenieki Parish (now Jelgava Municipality) in the Courland Governorate in 1892 to Jānis Cēsnieks and Anna Ozola and qualified as a physician.

She was a founder member of the National Centre, which contested the 1920 Constitutional Assembly elections as part of the Group of Non-Partisan Citizens. Cēsniece-Freidenfelde was one of the members elected, serving in the Assembly until 1922. She was part of the central committee of the National Centre from 1921 until 1926. In 1922 she became the first head of the Latvian Women's National League. She died in December 1929.

References

1892 births
1929 deaths
People from Jelgava Municipality
People from Courland Governorate
National Union (Latvia) politicians
Deputies of the Constitutional Assembly of Latvia
20th-century Latvian women politicians
Latvian physicians